SAS: Who Dares Wins is a reality quasi-military training television programme broadcast by Channel 4 in the United Kingdom since 19 October 2015. There have been eight main series and four celebrity spin-off series.

Format
The show pits contestants against harsh environments all around the world in a shortened two-week long training course that is designed to replicate a number of elements of the actual United Kingdom Special Forces selection course; a notoriously difficult programme that has been known to claim the lives of those who take it on, although the training has been modified to prevent fatalities. The show's Directing Staff take the recruits through hostile and unforgiving warfare environments, while testing their mental and physical ability through a series of tests. Unlike many reality competition series, there are no formal elimination points; instead, contestants may be culled by the DS, voluntarily withdraw, or be removed for medical reasons at any point prior to completion.

History
The fourth series which aired in early 2019 allowed female recruits to take part for the first time, in line with the Ministry of Defence's announcement that Special Forces selection would be open to women. The fifth series proper aired in January and February 2020.

Cast
The Chief Instructor was Ant Middleton who is an ex-United Kingdom Special Forces operator serving in the Special Boat Service.  He was dismissed from the show by Channel 4 in 2021 over his 'personal conduct'. In October 2021, former United States Recon Marine Rudy Reyes was announced as the series's new Chief Instructor. The other Directing Staff (DS) instructors are: Jason Fox, a former SBS operator; Mark 'Billy' Billingham, an ex-SAS Sergeant Major; and  veteran Navy SEAL Senior Chief Remi Adeleke - who left in 2022, after appearing in that year's civilian and celebrity series.

Series 8 saw the contestants tested in the jungle of Thung Ui, north Vietnam, and Mark 'Billy' Billingham as the Chief Instructor because of his extensive jungle warfare training. Joining the Directing Staff is Chris Oliver, a former Royal Marine Mountain Leader and ex-Special Boat Service operator.

Series overview

Winners

Celebrity series
In April 2019, a special series in which all of the recruits were celebrities was aired as Celebrity SAS: Who Dares Wins, for Stand Up to Cancer UK. Among the celebrity recruits were Victoria Pendleton, Ben Foden, Heather Fisher, AJ Odudu, Jeff Brazier, Wayne Bridge, Sam Thompson (Made in Chelsea), Andrea McLean, Jeremy Irvine, Dev, Louise Mensch and Camilla Thurlow (Love Island).

A second celebrity series began airing on Monday 20 April 2020. Among the celebrity recruits were: Katie Price, Joey Essex, Anthea Turner, Helen Skelton, Brendan Cole, John Fashanu, Nikki Sanderson, Jack Maynard (YouTube star), Lauren Steadman, Locksmith (DJ of Rudimental), Tony Bellew and Yasmin Evans.

A third celebrity series began airing on 29 August 2021. Among the celebrity recruits were: Ulrika Jonsson, Kerry Katona, Alexandra Burke, Wes Nelson, James Cracknell, Shanaze Reade, Ore Oduba, Aled Davies, Vicky Pattison, Saira Khan, Kieron Dyer and Jake Quickenden.

A fourth series began airing on 4 September 2022. Among the celebrity recruits were: Calum Best, Maisie Smith, Jonathan Broom-Edwards, Ashley Cain, Dwain Chambers, Shannon Courtenay, Jennifer Ellison, Jade Jones, Amber Gill, AJ Pritchard, Curtis Pritchard, Ferne McCann, Pete Wicks and Fatima Whitbread; she was 60 years old when the series was filmed and is the show's oldest recruit.

</onlyinclude>

Winners

Series 1 (2019)

Series 2 (2020)

Series 3 (2021)

Series 4 (2022)

Series 5 (2023)

American version - Special Forces: World’s Toughest Test

On 7 September 2022, an American version was announced. The series premiered on 4 January 2023 on Fox Broadcasting Company.

International versions
An Australian version of the show is currently being produced for Seven Network as SAS Australia. The Swedish version,  (English: Secrets of the Elite Force), is broadcast on TV4 and premiered on 24 January 2021. It won the reality show category award at Kristallen 2021. The Finnish version, Erikoisjoukot (English: Special Forces), premiered on 30 May 2022, on Nelonen and its streaming service Ruutu. An American version, Special Forces: World's Toughest Test, is set to premiere on 4 January 2023 on Fox.

See also
SAS: Are You Tough Enough?, similar UK TV show aired by the BBC from 2002 to 2004.
Special Forces: Ultimate Hell Week (2015–2017)
Who Dares Wins, a 1982 British action film on the SAS.

References

External links
 
 
 
Special Forces: World's Toughest Test on Fox

Channel 4 reality television shows
2010s British reality television series
2020s British reality television series
2015 British television series debuts
English-language television shows
Works about the Special Air Service
British military television series